Manuel Eduardo Medina Mariño (born July 14, 1976 in Aragua de Barcelona, Anzoátegui) is a Venezuelan professional bicycle road racing cyclist and former Venezuelan national cycling champion. He was nicknamed "El Gato" during his career.

Major results

1998
 3rd Overall Vuelta a Venezuela
2002
 3rd Time trial, National Road Championships
 3rd Overall Vuelta a Venezuela
1st Stage 11
2003
 10th Overall Vuelta a Venezuela
1st Mountains classification
2004
 1st Stage 6 Vuelta al Táchira
2005
 1st Overall Vuelta Ciclista Aragua
1st Stage 5
 1st Stage 1 Vuelta a Colombia
 1st Stage 3a Vuelta a Venezuela
2006
 National Road Championships
1st  Road race
3rd Time trial
 1st Overall Vuelta al Táchira
1st Stages 5 & 13
 1st Stage 5 Vuelta a Colombia
 1st Stage 5 Clasico Ciclistico Banfoandes
 5th Overall Vuelta a Venezuela
1st Stage 8
 8th Central American and Caribbean Games – Road race
2007
 1st Overall Vuelta al Oriente
1st Stage 5
 1st Stages 3 & 7 Vuelta a Colombia
 1st Stage 12 Vuelta a Guatemala
 2nd Pan American Road Race Championships
 2nd Overall Vuelta al Táchira
1st Stages 6 & 8
 2nd Overall Vuelta a Yacambu-Lara
1st Stage 6
 2nd Overall Clasico Pedro Infante
 3rd Overall Vuelta a Bramon
2008
 1st Overall Vuelta al Táchira
1st Stages 4, 6, 11 & 13
 1st Overall Vuelta a Guatemala
1st Stages 3, 8 & 9
 2nd Road race, National Road Championships
 6th Overall Vuelta a Venezuela
2009
 3rd Overall Vuelta a Cuba
 6th Overall Vuelta al Táchira
2010
 3rd Overall Vuelta a Venezuela
2011
 1st Overall Vuelta al Táchira
1st Stage 5
 1st Stage 9 Vuelta a Venezuela
 2nd Overall Vuelta a la Independencia Nacional
1st Stage 5
2012
 1st Mountains classification Vuelta a Venezuela
 3rd Overall Vuelta al Táchira
1st Stage 9
2013
 5th Overall Vuelta al Táchira
1st Mountains classification
1st Stages 8 & 9
2017
 5th Overall Vuelta a Venezuela
1st Mountains classification 
2019
 10th Overall Vuelta al Táchira

References

External links

1976 births
Living people
People from Barcelona, Venezuela
Venezuelan male cyclists
Venezuelan sportspeople in doping cases
Doping cases in cycling
Vuelta a Colombia stage winners
Vuelta a Venezuela stage winners
Competitors at the 2006 Central American and Caribbean Games